Sesame Street has many international versions across the world. Each uses some original characters, created specifically to represent their own culture. The following list highlights some of these characters. All characters are Muppets, unless otherwise mentioned.

Open Sesame (Australia)
 Ollie – A yellow orange monster who is the cousin of Elmo, and has been stated to be four-and-a-half years old. Segments involving him commonly play before and after episodes of Open Sesame on Nick Jr.

Sisimpur (Bangladesh)
 Halum: A Bengal tiger.
 Ikri Mikri: A small blue monster.
 Shiku: A small jackal.
 Tuktuki: A female Muppet.
 Manik-Ratan: A pair of two sheep. Together they are addressed as Manik-Ratan.

Sésamo first show (Brazil)
 Garibaldo – A giant, shy, blue (yellow in the 2007 version) bird. Similar to Big Bird.
 Gugu – A green Muppet monster with a blue nose and orange cheeks. Similar to Oscar the Grouch.
 Juca (Armando Bogus) – A toy maker who taught children his craft.
 Ana Maria (Sonia Braga) – A teacher and Juca's cousin.
 Gabriela (Aracy Balabanian) – The wife of Juca
 Funga-funga – A red Muppet elephant who didn't like how others looked at him.
 Bel – A pink/purple Muppet monster that appeared in the 2007 version

Canadian Sesame Street, later Sesame Park (Canada)

 Louis – A French-Canadian otter
 Basil – A polar bear
 Dodi – A Muppet who is essentially a Jack-Of-All-Trades, though most commonly known as a bush pilot.
 Katie – A girl who uses a wheelchair.
 Chaos – A cat who is similar to Elmo, serving the same role.
 Beau Beaver – A beaver (animated)

Zhima Jie (China)
 Da Niao –  A Chinese version of Big Bird.
 Hu Hu Zhu – A furry blue pig. Appeared in the 1998 version.
 Xiao Mei Zi – A red Elmo-like monster. Appeared in the 1998 version.
 Lily – A young female tiger cub. Appeared in the 2010 version.

Alam Simsim (Egypt)
 Nimnim – A tall furry green creature with orange legs, having a similar role to Big Bird.
 Filfil – A fuzzy-bearded purple monster who likes to eat 'Asilaya (honey sesame sticks), similar to Cookie Monster.
 Khokha – A furry peach-colored monster who likes to play pretend.
 Am Gherghis – A human who is the local shopkeeper.
 Am Hussein – A human who is a carpenter.
 Ama Kheireya – A human. Also called Um Kareem, she is the wife of Am Hussein, mother of Mona and Kareem.
 Mona – A human who is the teenage daughter of Kheireya and Hussein.
 Kareem – A human who is the pre-teen brother of Mona.
 Ama Nabila – A human who is the proprietress of the bookstore/library.

Sesamstraße (Germany)
 Samson – A male bear, similar in role and full-body puppet, to Big Bird (1978–2008, 2013–present)
 Simson – Samson's cousin and lookalike, often seen with a hat or a tie to distinguish him from Samson (on and off in 1989–1998)
 Tiffy – A pink female bird (1978–2005)
 Finchen – A (former male, now female) snail (on and off from 1983, 1989–present)
 Rumpel – A green Grouch that lives in a rainbarrel. He has Gustav, a pet caterpillar (1989–2008)
 Buh – A male owl (1989–2002)
 Feli Filu – A blue female monster reporter (2000–2007)
 Pferd – A male horse (2002–present)
 Wolle – A male lamb (2002–present)
 Lena – A pink monster baby (2005–2009)
 Moni – A female photographer (2005–2007)
 Ulli von Bödefeld – An androgyne hedgehog-like creature (1978-early 1986)
 Wolf vom Wortersee – A green wolf (2007–present)

Humans in Sesamstraße 1978–1986
 Henning (Henning Venske, a West German actor – 1978–1979) –
 Lilo (Lieselotte Pulver, a Swiss actress 1978–1986) –
 Uwe (Uwe Friedrichsen, a West German actor 1979–1982) –
 Horst (Horst Janson, a West German actor 1979–1986) –
 Ute (Ute Willing, a German actress 1979–1986) –
 Ilse (Ilse Biberti, a German actress 1979–1982) –
 Elisabeth (Elisabeth Vitouch, a German actress 1979–1982) –
 Manfred (Manfred Krug, an East German actor – 1982–1986) –

Humans in Sesamstraße 1986–present
 Georg (Gernot Endemann, a German actor – 1986–1999) –
 Bettina (Hildegard Krekel, a German actress – 1986–1989, Kirsten Spick, a German actress – 1989–1999) –
 Opa Brass (Ferdinand Dux, a German actor – 1992–2000) –
 Pensionswirtin Helmi (Senta Bonneval, a German actress – 1995–1999) –
 Musiker Alex (Alexander Geringas, a German-Greek actor – 1995–2000) –
 Jiviana (Vijak Bajani, a German-Turkish actress – 1995–2001) –
 Nils (Nils Julius, a German actor – 2000–present) –
 Caro (Caroline Kiesewetter, a German actress – 2000–2002, Miriam Krause, a German actress – 2002–present) –
 Zauberer PePe (Dirk Bach, a German comedian – 2000–2012) –
 Anke (Anke Engelke, a German comedian – 2003–present) –
 Mehmet (Mehmet Yilmaz, a German-Turkish actor – 2003–present) –
 Ella (Franziska Troegner, a German actress – 2003–present) –

Galli Galli Sim Sim (India)

 Jugaadu – A Muppet who likes to find innovative solutions to fix problems, and does not view his disability as a handicap.
 Basha Bhaijaan – Owns a corner store and knows several Indian languages.
 Sid – A Muppet who is a cool, smart child and Googly is a fan of his style and dancing.
 Dawa Di – Basha's wife, who is from North East India, and teaches dance.
 Kabir – Basha Bhaijaan and Dawa Di's son, who is active and curious.
 Col. Albert Pinto – A retired army person, and advocate for healthy living and civic sense.
 Rukmini Pinto (Doctor Aunty) – Col. Pinto's wife.
 Chamki, – A tomboyish five-year-old girl, dressed most often, in a school uniform.
 Boombah – An eight feet tall, pink lion equivalent of Big Bird.
 Googly – A six-year-old, adorable and furry blue monster with a penchant for asking tricky questions.
 Aanchoo – A purple creature who is a storehouse of interesting stories from all over the world.
 Hero – An orange coloured Muppet who loves to dress himself up.
 Khadoosa – As the name suggests, he is the grouchy neighbour in the Galli but is never intentionally mean.

Jalan Sesama (Indonesia)
 Momon – A five-year-old yellow monster who learns to draw letters and loves drawing and counting.
 Putri – An active young girl who is always asking Momon for help.
 Tantan – A wise female orangutan that settles every dispute on Jalan Sesama.
 Jabrik – A baby rhinoceros that is always complaining and laughing.
 Agen Rahasia 123 (Secret Agent 123)  – A James Bond-like agent who have a mission to solve a problem caused by a goat

Rechov Sumsum/Shalom Sesame (Israel)
 Kipi Ben Kipod/Kippi Kippod – A giant porcupine analogous to Big Bird
 Moishe Oofnik – Oscar the Grouch's cousin 
 Abigail – A purple female monster
 Brosh – An orange monster
 Mahboub – A blue monster
 Noah – A red monster
 Sivan – A girl who uses a wheelchair. She moved to Sésamo near the end of its second run.

Sesami Sutorīto (Japan)
 Teena – A pink monster who likes to sing.
 Mojabo – A green and purple monster who likes to exercise.
 Pierre – A blue-and-yellow frog.
 Arthur – A little yellow bird.
 Grorie – An orange Grover-like monster.
 Meg – A Japanese girl.

Iftah Ya Simsim (Kuwait)
 No'Man – A camel equivalent of Big Bird
 Melsoon – A light green parrot wearing a tie (blue in the 2015 version)
 Yaqut – A lavender monster with a long nose
 Abla – A full-body lavender cat 
 Shams – A yellow monster that appeared in the 2015 version

Sésamo (Mexico/Latin America)
 Abelardo Montoya – A large parrot equivalent of Big Bird, with Green and Red feathers (Mexico's National colours; also the colors of a Parrot, one of Mexico's most numerous and representative birds). He is also the cousin of Big Bird.
 Abelardo – A red dragon equivalent of Big Bird.
 Bodoque – A Grouch that lives in boxes. He is the cousin of Oscar the Grouch.
 Cuernos (Horns) – A red monster with a characteristic couple of horns and vicious teeth.
 El Barón Púrpura (The Purple Baron) – A Muppet portraying a lackluster air pilot. A satire of The Red Baron.
 Lola – A female relative of Pancho and Abelardo's best friend; a joyful young pink monster. She is the cousin of Elmo and Zoe.
 Paco – A parrot, the equivalent of America's Oscar the Grouch
 Pancho – A blue-colored monster with a gruff voice.
 Elefancio – Pancho's pet elephant. Only the trunk is ever seen like the trunk Oscar the Grouch's pet elephant Fluffy.
 Multimonstruos – Red Anything Monsters, appear as babies, pirates, etc.
 Multimuppets – Brown Anything Muppets
 Four birds
 A macaw
 Poco Loco
 A penguin
 A chicken
 Stuckweed
 A watermelon
 Anything Muppets
 Monsters
 Grouches
 Other animals

Humans in Sésamo
 Carlos
 José – The Storekeeper
 Alicia
 Fernando (Justo Martinez) – The police officer
 Mercedes
 Teresa (Romelia Aguero) –
 Sandra (Ana Silvia Garza) –
 Sebastian (Jaime Garza) –
 Miguel (Alejandro Ibarra) –
 Ana (Rocio Ortiz) –
 Goyo (Raoul Rossi) –
 Pepe (Salvador Sanchez) –
 Paula (Rosalia Valdez) –
 La Abuela (Evita Muñoz, Beatriz Aguirre) –
 Don Boni (Edgar Vivar, Sergio Corona) –
 Carmen (María Del Sol) –
 Gertrudis (Socorro Bonilla, Leonorilda Ochoa) –
 Pablo (Ariel López Padilla, Benjamin Rivero) –
 Maria (Paty Díaz, M'Balia Marichal Ibar) –
 Susana (Liza Echeverria, Mariana Garza) –
 Juan (Alberto Mayagoitia, Raúl Magaña) –
 Neftalí (Héctor Hernández, Pedro Romo) –
 Daniela (Maria Fernanda Urdapilleta, Mariana Botas, Paula Gutiérrez) –
 Manuel (Manuel Bermudez, Charlie Santana, Alan Sanchez, Santiago Hernández) –
 ToNo (Isaac Castro) –
 Romina (Anahí Sánchez) –

Sesamstraat (Netherlands)
 Pino – A blue swan equivalent of Big Bird, with blue , light yellow , pink,feathers and an orange beak. He is also the cousin of Big Bird.
 Tommie – A Muppet dog
 Ieniemienie – A Muppet mouse
 Purk – A Muppet pig
 Troel – Tommie's girlfriend

Humans in Sesamstraat
 Buurman Baasje – male
 Elvan – female
 Frank – male
 Gerda – female
 Hakim – male
 Lot – female
 Meneer Aart – male
 Paula – female
 Rik – male
 Sien – female

Sesame Tree (Northern Ireland)
 Potto – A male 'monster' style Muppet and the cousin of Telly Monster.
 Hilda – A female Irish Hare
 Claribelle – A red Muppet bird.
 Archie – A bespectacled squirrel.
 Bookworms – A bunch of Bookworms live amongst Potto's books.
 Weatherberries – A bunch of singing fruit. They often announce the weather whenever Hilda asks what the weather will be like today.

Sesam Stasjon (Norway)
 Max Mekker – A big blue monster who owns a train station called "Sesam Stasjon".
 Alfa – A female yellow monster.
 Bjarne – A pink man who owns a ticket booth.
 Py – A red monster who hatched from a blue egg.

Humans in Sesam Stasjon
 O. Tidemann – A kind but somewhat blustery grandfatherly-type of a station master who generally manages to keep the station running smoothly, even if he doesn't always get the peace and quiet he wants.
 Leonora Dorothea Dahl – A former world-famous singer who used to travel around the world. She still likes to sing at any opportunity, and is a good cook.

Sesame (Philippines)
 Pong Pagong – A clumsy, pink full-body turtle wearing a baseball cap.
 Kiko Matsing – A brown monkey.

Human characters
 Kuya Mario portrayed by Junix Inocian
 Ate Sylvia portrayed by Susan Africa
 Aling Nena portrayed by Angie Ferro
 Mang Lino portrayed by Joe Gruta
 Luz portrayed by Dessa Quesada
 Ben portrayed by Tito Quesada

Ulica Sezamkowa (Poland)
 Bazyli – A large multicolored dragon.
 Beata – A short female sheep.
 Pędzipotwór – A turquoise female monster.

Humans on Ulica Sezamkowa
 Mom (Anna Radwan, Polish actress) –
 Dad (Artur Dziurman, Polish actor) –
 Grandpa (Andrzej Buszewicz, Polish actor) –
 Kasia – A girl.
 Krzyś – A boy.

Rua Sésamo (Portugal)
 Poupas – An orange bird and the cousin of Big Bird.
 Ferrão – A brown-colored version of Oscar the Grouch that lived inside a bottomless barrel in the town square on the street.
 Tita – A gray Muppet cat.

Ulitsa Sezam (Russia)
 Zeliboba – A 9-foot furry blue Dvorovoi (tree spirit) who enjoys dancing
 Businka – A bright pink monster who finds joy in everything
 Kubik – An orange monster who is the resident pensive problem-solver who used to be a schoolteacher

Takalani Sesame (South Africa)
 Kami – A yellow monster who raised controversy in the USA due to her HIV+ status
 Moshe – A four year old, vegetarian meerkat who is extremely optimistic and loves to dance. He is Takalani Sesame's equivalent to Big Bird.
 Zikwe – A blue monster who owns a taxicab with no wheels
 Kupukeji – A green worm found by Zikwe and cared for by Moshe
 Elmo – A Muppet red monster who loves to play with Zuzu and explore new things. He is from the same model as on the American series.
 Zuzu – A young purple monster who loves acting
 Basma – A young purple monster who loves new experiences and music 
 Jad – A young yellow monster who has a passion with visual arts and is a good organizer 
 Grover – A blue monster who appears in the Playtime segments along with Basma and Jad

Barrio Sésamo (Spain)
 Espinete – A large pink hedgehog.
 Don Pimpón – A monster of an unknown species who is another Full-Bodied Muppet that works as a farmer.
 Caponata – A chicken equivalent to Big Bird.
 Perezgil – A male green snail.
 Bluki – A blue cat-like Muppet.
 Gaspar – A red-haired man who works at a market.
 Vera – A female yellow monster who is similar to Elmo, serving the same role.
 Bubo – A brown owl.
 Epi y Blas – Two characters serving the same roles as Ernie and Bert

Ahlan Simsim (Syria)
 Basma – a purple monster who loves new experiences
 Jad – a yellow monster who loves to paint
 Ma'zooza – a baby goat
 Ameera - a green monster who has a spinal-cord injury she loves science and basketball

Susam Sokağı (Turkey)
 Kirpik – A Grouch who lives in a pile of boxes.
 Minik Kuş – A red version of Big Bird.
 Kurabiye Canavarı – A Turkey counterpart of Cookie Monster.

Play with Me Sesame (United Kingdom)
 Domby – A male 'monster' style Muppet, originally from Scotland. He and his friend, Kit, live in a castle on top of a hill.
 Kit – Domby's best friend. They spend most of their time in the castle kitchen, bedroom and living room (very similar to Ernie and Bert sketches). He is originally from Manchester. They sometimes visit schools and playgroups to sing or talk with the children.

Lists of children's television characters
Non-American television series based on American television series